Laredo Christian Academy was an Assemblies of God private Christian school located in Laredo, Texas. Grades Pre-K through 12th were taught in the Academy. In 2002 there were 162 students attending Laredo Christian Academy. The school closed permanently at the end of the 2002 school year. Curriculum was based on Accelerated Christian Education materials.

History 
Reverend Ken Robinson, then senior pastor of First Assembly of God, was first principal of Laredo Christian Academy. Sara Hanlon was the school's second principal, after serving as school secretary to Robinson. Mrs. Salinas served as the third school principal. Pastor Tony Gutierrez served as principal when the school closed. Cindy Morales also served as interim principal.

External links
 Laredo Catholic Academy Statistics

Christian schools in Texas
High schools in Laredo, Texas
Private K-12 schools in Texas